Cesare Bertolla (Lucca, 1845 - Rome, 1920) was an Italian painter, described as specializing in the painting of landscapes with animals and figures from the marshy and malarial (Paludi) regions, painting in areas around Rome.

He studied in Rome, and was part of an informal set of artists and painters in Rome including Carlo Ferrari, Enrico Coleman, Alessandro Coleman, Onorato Carlandi, and Cesare Pascarella.<ref>[https://books.google.com/books?id=kHA-AQAAIAAJ&q=Cesare+Bertolla Roma, una capitale in Europa 1870-1911], Exhibit at Castel Sant'Angelo,  published by Alinari 1990.</ref> In the Turin Exhibition of 1880, he exhibited Autumn. In the 1883 Mostra Internazionale Artistica of Rome, he exhibited: Le bufale nella pineta; La Porta San Lorenzo; and the La Porta del Cristiano al Marocco. At a Roman exhibition of 1889, he submitted Mattino, Alla spalletta, La valle del Teverone, and  Ricordo di Terracina''.

References

1845 births
1920 deaths
Painters from Lucca
19th-century Italian painters
Italian male painters
20th-century Italian painters
19th-century Italian male artists
20th-century Italian male artists